Mynydd Y Gelli is one of the mountains that forms the Rhondda Valley in South Wales, United Kingdom.

The name Mynydd Y Gelli is also loaned to the Iron Age burial site that lies on one of its sides above Tonypandy, Clydach Vale and Llwynypia. Another more grandiose name for the site is the Rhondda Stonehenge.

Mountains and hills of Rhondda Cynon Taf